The following is a list of notable Martinians, former pupils and masters of the three schools established by Claude Martin.
 La Martiniere Calcutta in Kolkata, India.
 La Martiniere Lucknow in Lucknow, India.
 La Martiniere Lyon in Lyon, France.

La Martinière Lyon was divided into three independent colleges in the 1960s :
 La Martiniere Monplaisir in Lyon, France.
 La Martiniere Duchère in Lyon, France.
 La Martiniere Diderot in Lyon, France.

Notable Martinians - Calcutta

Science

 Dr. Gagandeep Kang, vaccine scientist at CMC Vellore (known as India’s 'vaccine godmother'), first Indian woman to be elected as a Fellow of Royal Society, London.

Business
 C K Birla, industrialist.
 Sir Catchick Paul Chater, philanthropist, father of modern Hong Kong, Benefactor of La Martiniere Calcutta.
 Dr. Vijay Mallya, billionaire businessman, chairman of United Breweries and Kingfisher Airlines and a Rajya Sabha MP.
Harshavardhan Neotia, chairman of Ambuja Neotia Group
Hemant Kanoria, industrialist, chairman and managing director of Srei Infrastructure Finance Limited.
Pramod Bhasin, founder and first CEO of Genpact.

Sports
 Nafisa Ali, swimming champion, actress, former Miss India and politician.
 Chhanda Gain, first Bengali woman to climb Mount Everest
 Leander Paes, tennis player, India's only medallist at the 1996 Summer Olympics in Atlanta, Captain of the Indian Davis Cup team

Education
 John Mason, schoolmaster and educationist.

Entertainment
Ali Fazal, actor. 
 Merle Oberon, actress.
Bikram Ghosh, tabla player.
Kiran Rao, filmmaker, producer.
Pritish Nandy, film producer.
Rajiv Mehrotra, documentary filmmaker, television anchor.
Anuvab Pal, comedian, author and scriptwriter.
Sir Cliff Richard, English pop/rock singer.
Adrit Roy, actor

Government
 Dr Saiyid Nurul Hasan, historian, Union Minister of Education and former Governor of West Bengal, India.

Journalism
 Swapan Dasgupta, journalist, columnist and former managing editor of India Today.
 Sunanda K. Datta-Ray, former editor of The Statesman.
 Jug Suraiya, associate editor of the Times of India, author and columnist.
 Sanjoy Narayan, journalist, editor-in-chief of the Hindustan Times
 Suhel Seth, columnist and CEO of Counselage, advertising and TV.
Paranjoy Guha Thakurta, journalist.

Politics
  Brigadier Kamakhya Prasad Singh Deo, politician and former Minister.
 Mausam Noor, MP, North Malda, West Bengal, elected 2009
Chandan Mitra, Member of Parliament and eminent journalist.

Notable Martinians - Lucknow
The list of Old Martinians from the Lucknow School includes.

Art & Architecture
 Architect Rudraksha Charan, Principal Architect, 42 mm Architecture.

Business
 Shahnaz Husain, beautician and entrepreneur.

Defence
 Lieutnant General Gul Hassan Khan, Chief of Army Staff, Pakistan Army.
 Lieutenant General Akhtar Abdur Rahman, director of Inter-Services Intelligence (ISI) of Pakistan, Masterminded the Jihad against the Soviet Army Pakistan Army.

Education
 Frederick James Rowe, poet, former English teacher at the Lucknow school and composer of the official school song Hail Hail the Name we Own.

Entertainment
 Roshan Abbas, TV and radio host.
 Muzaffar Ali, painter, clothing designer and film director /producer.
 Priyanka Chopra, actress and former Miss World in 2000.
 Nusli Wadia, fashion entrepreneur and editor of Gladrags. Her husband is the noted industrialist Nusli Wadia.
 Amit Sadh, Indian television and film actor.
 Ali Fazal, Indian television and film actor.
 George Baker, Indian television and film actor.

Government
 Isha Basant Joshi, I.A.S. the second lady officer in the Indian Administrative Service and the first Indian girl to be admitted to the Girls' College.
 K. Raghunath, former Foreign Secretary of India and Indian Ambassador to Russia.
 Sameer Sharma Indian Administrative Service, secretary to Government, Andhra Pradesh

Journalism
 Vinod Mehta, magazine editor
 Saeed Naqvi, a leading journalist in Delhi brother of Shanney Naqvi.
 Siddharth Varadarajan, founder of The Wire and former editor of The Hindu.
 Varul Mayank, founder of Knocksense.

Musicians
 Munni Begum Famous Pakistani Gazal Singer, Now lives in the USA

Literature
 Krishna Prakash Bahadur, writer, poet and philosopher.
 Mukul Deva, an auto didact and well-known polymath, he is an ex-army officer, best-selling author, keynote speaker, executive coach, mentor, facilitator, consultant and entrepreneur.
 Attia Hosain, journalist and writer.
 Allan Sealy, author of The Trotter-Nama, short-listed for the Booker Prize.

Politics
 Nawab Sir Sayyid Hassan Ali Mirza Khan, KCIE, the first Nawab of Murshidabad.
 Arun Nehru, political analyst, ex-minister and columnist.
 Ali Khan Mahmudabad, historian, professor of political science at Ashoka University, member of Samajwadi Party.

Science and technology
 Praveen Chaudhari, physicist, pioneer in superconductor research, former Vice President of Science at IBM , and recipient of National Medal of Technology.
 Rajendra K. Pachauri, chairman of the Intergovernmental Panel on Climate Change The IPCC, led by Dr. Pachauri, shared the 2007 Nobel Peace Prize with Al Gore.

Sports
 Vece Paes, Olympian and father of Leander Paes

Others
 Anjali Gopalan founder and executive director of The Naz Foundation (India) Trust, an NGO dedicated to the fight against the HIV/AIDS epidemic in India. Anjali began working on issues related to HIV/AIDS and marginalised communities in the United States. In 2012, Time placed Gopalan in its list of the 100 most influential people in the world.
 Edward Hilton, author of an eye-witness guide to the siege of Lucknow.
 Charles Palmer, civil engineer and survivor of the siege of Lucknow.
 Yasoob Abbas, an eminent Indian Muslim Scholar, Lucknow, India

Notable Martinians - Lyon

Business
Inabata Katsutarō, industrialist and pioneer of japanese cinema;
François Gillet, textile and dye industrialist of Lyon;
Jean-Michel Aulas, businessman, president of Olympique lyonnais.

Entertainment
 Lumiere Brothers, two of the first filmmakers;
Alexandre Promio, pioneer of cinema.

Literature
 Frédéric Dard, writer and author of the San-Antonio series;
 Henri Béraud, novelist and journalist, won the Prix Goncourt in 1922.

Art and architecture 
 Tony Garnier, Garnier is considered the forerunner of 20th century French architects. He learnt painting and drafting at the École Technique de la Martinière in Lyon (1883–86). It is his designed building which house the weaving school at La Martiniere Diderot.
 Étienne Pagny, noted French sculptor who studied Architecture at La Martiniere Lyon and later practiced as a sculptor.
 Gilles Perraudin, noted Architect.

See also
 La Martiniere Calcutta
 La Martiniere College
 La Martiniere Lyons
 La Martiniere Lucknow
 Claude Martin
 The will of Claude Martin

References

 
 
 
Martinians